Breton Island is a small rocky island lying  southwest of Empereur Island. It was charted in 1950 by the French Antarctic Expedition and named by them for their largely Breton crew.

See also 
 List of Antarctic and sub-Antarctic islands

References 

Islands of Adélie Land